A reed trio, also known as a trio d’anches, is a mixed chamber ensemble consisting of three reed instruments: oboe, clarinet and bassoon. Either term can also refer to a musical composition for this ensemble.

History
The origins of the reed trio are more recent than the wind quintet: while the latter arose early in the nineteenth century, the first known composition for reed trio, a work by French composer Ange Flégier, was not written until 1897. The reed trio ranks second only to the wind quintet among woodwind chamber ensembles in terms of popularity and quantity of original repertoire. Much of the original repertoire for the reed trio was written for Oubradous’ ensemble as well as the contemporaneous  (René Daraux, oboe; Fernand Gossens, clarinet; Ange Maugendre, bassoon). Professional reed trios that have produced commercial recordings include the Saarland Radio Wind Trio, Ensemble Trielen, Trio Lézard, the Cavell Trio, Trio d’Anches de Cologne, Trio d’Anches Hamburg, Trois Bois, Trio d'Anches de Monte-Carlo, Zagreb Wind Trio and Ocotillo Winds.

Oiseau-Lyre Wind Trios 
Several French composers are responsible for contributing some of the first works for reed trio and have written standards that are part of the Oiseau-Lyre Wind Trio Collection. This collection consists of seven compositions by Darius Milhaud, Jacques Ibert, Georges Auric, and Henry Barraud. These works came as a response to the formation of the well-received Trio d’anches de Paris in the 1930s. Louise Hanson-Dyer collaborated with the Trio d'anches de Paris to publish and record the music with her company Éditions de l’Oiseau-Lyre.

List of reed trios by country

Argentina
, Sonata Trió (1960)

Belgium

, Trio (1950)
, Trio à anches (1946)
, Trio (1948)
Jacqueline Fontyn, Sept petites pièces (1954)
Marinus De Jong, Trio, Op. 126 (1961)
Victor Legley, Trio, Op. 11 (1942)
René Maniet, Trio d'anches (1959), Trio d'anches No. 2 (1960), Concert d'anches (1964)

Arthur Meulemans, Trio (1933)
Arie Van de Moortel, Trio No. 1, Op. 3 (1939, rev. 1954), Divertimento No. 1 (1962), Divertimento No. 3 (1966)
, Trio No. 2 (1941), Trio No. 3 (1960)
Marcel Poot, Divertimento (1942), Ballade (1954)
, Trois jouets, Op. 53 (1954)

Brazil

Maria Inês Guimarães, Primavera

Heitor Villa-Lobos, Trio (1921)

Bulgaria

Marin Goleminov, Trio (1966)

, Trio en mi, Op. 14 (1937)

Canada

Violet Archer, Divertimento (1949)
Bill Douglas, Trio (2007)
Sophie Carmen Eckhardt-Gramatté, Wind Trio I, E115 (1968)
Jacques Hétu, Four Miniatures (1987)

David L. Kaplan, Three Sketches (1955)
Blago Simeonov, Max and Moritz (1964)
León Zuckert, Reminiscences Argentinas: Suite para trio de viento (1981)

Croatia

Bruno Bjelinski, Gumpis Trio
Srđan Dedić, Šumatina
Krešimir Fribec, Miniature
Fran Lhotka, Trio

Ivo Maček, Trio (1994)
Rudolf Matz, Trio
Boris Papandopulo, Mala Suita (1949)
Vlado Špoljarić, Chaconne (1971)

Czech Republic/Slovakia

Vítězslava Kaprálová, Trio (1938, incomplete)
Iša Krejčí, Trio-Divertimento (1935)
, Trio

Bohuslav Martinů, Quatre Madrigaux, H. 266 (1937)
Erwin Schulhoff, Divertissement (1927)

Denmark

Gunnar Berg, Trio d'anches (1955)

Mogens Winkel Holm, Note-Book (1983)

France

Arthur Aharonian, Trio d'anches (1989)
Gabriel Allier, Scène champêtre (1920)
Claude Arrieu, Trio d’anches (1936)
Chantal Auber, Contraste (1994)
Georges Auric, Trio (1938)
Claude Ballif, Trio, Op. 8 (1952)
Roger Boutry, Divertissement
Eugène Bozza, Suite brève en trio (1947)
Pierre de Bréville, Trio d’anches
Joseph Canteloube, Rustiques (1946)
Marius Constant, Trio (1950)
Jean-Yves Daniel-Lesur, Suite (1939)
Désiré Dondeyne, Suite d'airs populaires (1962) 
Pierre-Max Dubois, Trio d'anches (1958)
Louis Durey, Divertissement, Op. 107
Maurice Faillenot, Suite brève
Georges Favre, Gouaches-Suite (1957)
Pierre-Octave Ferroud, Trio in E Major (1933)
, Trio (1897)
Félicien Forêt, Suite en trio (1953)
Jean Françaix, Divertissement
Maurice Franck, Trio d’anches (1937); Deuxième Trio d’anches (1960)
Noël Gallon, Suite en Trio
Ida Gotkovsky, Trio d’anches (1954)
Émile Goué, Three Pieces (1937)
Reynaldo Hahn, Églogue (1937)

Charles Huguenin, Trio No. 1, Op. 30 (c1905); Trio No. 2, Op. 31
Jacques Ibert, Cinq pièces en trio (1935)
, Trio (1972)
Manfred Kelkel, Divertimento (1958)
Charles Koechlin, Trio, Op. 206] (1945)
Marcel Labey, Suite pour trio d'anches, Op. 47
Aubert Lemeland, Canzoni di Asolo, Op. 100
Raymond Loucheur, Portraits
Henri Martelli, Trio d'anches
Jean Martinon, Sonatine No. 4 pour trio d’anches, Op. 26, No. 1 (194)
Georges Migot, Thrène (1946), Trio d'anches (1946)
Marcel Mihalovici, Trio, Op. 71 (1955)
Darius Milhaud, Pastorale, Op. 147 (1935), Suite d'après Corrette, Op. 161b (1937)
Paul Pierné, Bucolique variée (1947)
Jean Rivier, Petite Suite (1946)
Guy Ropartz, Entrata e Scherzetto (1947)
Albert Roussel, Andante d'un trio d'anches inacheve (1937)
Jeanine Rueff, Trois pièces (1960)
Henri Sauguet, Trio (1946)
, Haclaba
Alexandre Tansman, Suite pour trio d’anches (1954)
Henri Tomasi, Concert champêtre
Jacques Vallier, Trio d'anches
Marc Vaubourgoin, Trio (1927)
Alain Weber, Trio (1959)

Germany

Victor Bruns, Trio, Op. 49 (1979)
Harald Genzmer, Trio (1994)

Paul Höffer, Kleine Suite (1944), Thema mit Variationen (1944)
Bertold Hummel, Noël: Little Christmas Suite, Op. 87e

Hungary

Iván Erőd, Bläsertrio, Op. 4 
Ferenc Farkas, Maskarade: Commedia dell'arte (1986)
Miklós Kocsár, Divertimento

, Serenade
Erzsébet Szőnyi, Five Old Dances (1969)

Italy
Fulvio Caldini, Guillaume, Op. 10 (1983)

Japan

Sadao Bekku, Trio d’anches (1953)
Maki Ishii, Black Intention II

Jiro Mikami, Autumn Prelude in E minor
Makoto Shinohara, Trio d'anches (1956)

Lithuania

Vidmantas Bartulis, To Yesterday (1981)
Martynas Bialobžeskis, Meditatonic (1996)

Jonas Paulikas, From the Stories of Winnie-the-Pooh (1983)

Luxembourg

, Trio d'anches, Op. 5 (1953)

Claus Krumlovsky, Trio d'anches (1974)

Macedonia
Toma Prošev, Četiri eseja

Netherlands

Henk Badings, Trio No. 2
Rudolf Escher, Trio d’anches (1949)

Jaap Geraedts, Divertimento No. 1 (1943), Divertimento No. 2 (1946)
Jan Koetsier, 6 Bagatelles

Norway

Edvard Hagerup Bull, Trois bucoliques, Op. 14 (1953)

Trygve Madsen, Serenata Monellesca, Op. 26

Poland

Andrzej Dobrowolski, Trio (1956)
Benedykt Konowalski, Mini-Rondo (1973)
Simon Laks, Concertino pour trio d’anches (1966)

Witold Lutosławski, Trio (1945)
, Sonatina (1946)
Antoni Szałowski, Trio (1936), Divertimento (1956)

Romania

Maya Badian, Trio (1981)
Dumitru Bughici, op. 30 (1968)
Liviu Comes, Trio for oboe, clarinet et bassoon (1987)
Dora Cojocaru, Trio (1983)
Liviu Dănceanu, Ossia, op. 10 (1982)
Dan Dediu, Rondo alla Munchausen (2013)
Violeta Dinescu, Trio d'anches (1982)
Felicia Donceanu, Trio-divertisment (1978), Diptic (1989)
Anton Dogaru, 12  (1987)
, Petite suite bucolique (1953)
Dinu Lipatti, Trei Sonate de Scarlatti (1943)

Mihail Andreescu Skeletty, Trio (1957)
Gheorghe Stănescu, Trio, (1980)
Hans Peter Turk, Trio nr. 1 (1964), Trio nr. 2 (1981)
Paul Urmuzescu, 
Filip Vasile, Divertisment (1975)
Marina Vlad,  (1988)
Lucian Vlădescu,  (1988)
Adalbert Winkler,  (1988)

Russia

Mikhail Ippolitov-Ivanov, Two Kirghiz Songs (1931)
Dmitri Melkikh, Trio, Op. 17 (1926)

Tatiana Smirnova, Tercet, Op. 59, No. 4 (1984)

Sweden

Karl-Birger Blomdahl, Trio (1938)

Hilding Rosenberg, Trio, Op. 42 (1927)

Switzerland

Paul Juon, Arabesken, Op. 73 (1940)
Sándor Veress, Sonatina (1933)

Julien-François Zbinden, Trio d'anches, Op. 12 (1949)

United Kingdom

Mary Chandler, Divertimento (1956), Trio (1967)
Gordon Jacob, Trio

Patric Standford, Cartoons (1984)

United States

Jenni Brandon, The Sequoia Trio, Spider Trio, Found Objects: On the Beach, Metamorphosis, The Wildflower Trio  
James Chaudoir, Sept Vignettes (1996)

Kirke Mechem, Trio, Op. 8 (1959)
Steven Rydberg, Three Quicksteps (1984)

Reed trio with accompanying instruments

Reed trio with orchestra
Henri Tomasi, Divertimento Corsica for reed trio, strings and harp (1952)

Reed trio with piano

Lukáš Hurník, Fusion Music
Florent Schmitt, À tour d’anches, Op. 97 (1943)

Patric Standford, Suite Humoresque (1987)
Germaine Tailleferre, Sonata champêtre (1972), Menuet en fa (1979)

Reed trio with electronics
Dai Fujikura, Phantom Splinter (2009)

References

Further reading
 

Chamber music
Types of musical groups